Ivo Minář was the defending champion but decided not to participate.
Gastão Elias won the title by defeating Rogério Dutra da Silva 4–6, 6–2, 6–0 in the final.

Seeds

Draw

Finals

Top half

Bottom half

References
 Main Draw
 Qualifying Draw

Campeonato Internacional de Tenis de Santos - Singles
2013 Singles